HMS Diomede was a 50-gun fourth-rate ship of the line of the Diomede class of the Royal Navy. She was launched in 1798.

Service history
She was commissioned in March 1798 under Captain Charles Elphinstone, and deployed to the North Sea. On 6 December 1798 she sailed for the Cape of Good Hope. From December 1802 she was commanded by Captain Samuel Mottley, and was the flagship of Rear Admiral Sir James Saumarez from June 1803 for the next three years. In January 1804 she was commanded by Captain Hugh Downman (as Mottley had returned to Britain aboard ), and deployed to the Channel Islands and the North Sea. In April 1806 she was commanded by Commander Joseph Edmonds, and was in Popham's squadron at the Cape of Good Hope, then participated in the River Plate Expedition, once more commanded by Downman, then was paid off in June 1807.

Diomede was refitted at Portsmouth from September to November 1807, having been recommissioned in August 1807 under Captain Philip Dumaresque, who thereafter commanded . In 1808 she was commanded by Captain John Sykes, and was the flagship of Rear Admiral Sir Edmund Nagle at Guernsey. In 1809 she was commanded by Captain Hugh Cook for the next two years. She sailed on 22 April 1809 with a convoy to Saint Helena, and thereafter to the East Indies.

From June to September 1812, she was refitted at Chatham as a 26-gun troopship, and was recommissioned in October 1812 under Captain Charles Fabian. In 1813 she sailed for North America. In 1814 Diomede was commanded by Hugh Pigot until October, and thereafter by Captain George Kippen. The boats and some of the complement of the Diomede participated in the Battle of Lake Borgne in December 1814. In 1821 the survivors of the flotilla shared in the distribution of head-money arising from the capture of the American gun-boats and sundry bales of cotton. The Diomede returned to England in April 1815 and paid off. On 7 July 1815, Diomede was ordered to become a provisions depot vessel at Sheerness, but upon inspection was found to be too decayed so was broken up in August 1815.

Medal
In 1847 the Admiralty initiated the Naval General Service Medal. The clasps covered a variety of actions, from boat service to single-ship actions, to larger naval engagements, including major fleet actions. The engagement at Lake Borgne was deemed a boat service worthy enough of recognition by a clasp, and appears on the list of clasps for boat service during the War of 1812. The Admiralty issued a clasp (or bar) marked "14 Dec. Boat Service 1814" to surviving combatants who claimed the clasp.   This was the largest Boat Action for which the Naval General Service Medal was granted. In all, 205 survivors claimed it.

Notes and citations
Notes

Citations

Bibliography

External links
 Compilation of newspaper entries for HMS Diomede by the late Paul Benyon

1798 ships
Ships built in England
War of 1812 ships of the United Kingdom